Sebastian Weyer (pronounced , 4 December 1997) is a German Rubik's Cube speedsolver who specializes in 4x4x4 solving. Weyer has broken the 4x4x4 single solve world record 9 times and the average of five solves record 9 times. He set his first world record on 1 May 2011.

Weyer is the 2017 World Champion in 4x4x4, 3-time European Champion in 4x4x4, 2014 German Champion in 3x3x3, 8-time German Champion in 4x4x4, 5-time German Champion in 5x5x5, and 2013 German Champion in Megaminx.

Weyer held the world record for the single 4x4x4 solve from 15 September 2019 to 26 November 2021, with a time of 17.42 seconds set in the Danish Open 2019. This was the first-ever sub-18-second single in competition. He last held the world record for the average of five solves on 12 May 2018.

Weyer holds the European record for average of five 4x4x4 solves, being  21.46 seconds.

Weyer attended the World Championships in 2013, 2017, and 2019. At the 2013 World Championship in Las Vegas, Weyer placed 2nd in 4x4x4 and 3rd in 3x3x3. At the 2017 World Championship in Paris, Weyer won the 4x4x4 event. At the 2019 World Championship in Melbourne, Weyer placed 2nd in 4x4x4 and 3rd in 3x3x3, just as he did at his first World Championship in 2013.

Weyer is the brother of speedcuber Philipp Weyer, who is the 2019 3x3x3 World Champion.

Notable rankings: 
Rankings as of 8 September 2022.

References

Further reading 
 

Living people
German speedcubers
1997 births